The England national football team represents the country of England in international association football. It is fielded by The Football Association, the governing body of football in England, and competes as a member of the Union of European Football Associations (UEFA), which encompasses the countries of Europe. England competed in the first official international football match on 30 November 1872, a 0–0 draw with Scotland at Hamilton Crescent.

England have competed in numerous competitions, and all players who have been capped while playing for clubs not in the top division of English football, either as a member of the starting eleven or as a substitute, are listed below. Each player's details include his usual playing position while with the team, the number of caps earned and the years spent playing for England while also playing for a Football League club. For example, Trevor Brooking was capped 47 times, but 12 of those caps were when West Ham United were in the Second Division. The names are initially ordered by the year of debut, and then by alphabetical order.

Players

Players from non-League clubs

Players from Third Division clubs

Players from Second Division clubs

Notes

References 

Lists of England international footballers
Association football player non-biographical articles